Dezső Ránki (born 8 September 1951) is a Hungarian virtuoso concert pianist with a broad repertoire and a significant discography of solo, duo and concerto works.

Life and career
Born in Budapest, he began taking piano lessons at the Budapest Academy of Music at the age of eight. When he was thirteen, he enrolled at the Budapest Conservatory and from 1964 to 1969 was a pupil of Klára Máthé. Subsequently he studied from 1969 to 1973 at the Franz Liszt Academy of Music, with his mentors Pál Kadosa and Ferenc Rados. Among his classmates were renowned pianists András Schiff and Zoltán Kocsis. With Kocsis he featured in two Hungarian documentaries, on the Budapest Symphony Orchestra tour of the US 'Tizenhatezer Kilometer... A MRT Szimfonikus Zenekara Amerikaban' (1971), and 'Kocsis Zoltán es Ránki Dezső – Kettős Arckép' (1976) 'Kocsis Zoltán and Ránki Dezső – Double Portrait'.

From the time Ránki won first prize at the  Robert Schumann International Competition in Zwickau, he has had an international career performing in Europe, Scandinavia, the Soviet Union, the USA and Japan. His repertoire ranges from the Classical period (Mozart, Beethoven), through the Romantics (Schumann, Brahms) to contemporary works (Kurtag). He gave the premiere of the piano concerto (1984) of Zsolt Durkó.

He has played with the Berlin Philharmonic Orchestra, the London Philharmonic Orchestra, the Concertgebouw (Amsterdam), the Orchestre National de France under such conductors as Sir Georg Solti, Sándor Végh, Lorin Maazel, and Zubin Mehta. He was awarded twice the Kossuth Prize, the highest cultural award in Hungary.

From 1985, Ránki frequently performs duet recitals with his wife Edit Klukon. Together they have a son, Fülöp Ránki, who is also a skilled pianist. He has been a professor at the Ferenc Liszt Academy in Budapest.

Discography
Ránki has recorded mainly for Hungaroton; his large discography includes:
Bartók : Three Burlesques Op. 8c / Allegro Barbaro / The First Term At The Piano / Sonatina / Rumanian Folk Dances / Rumanian Christmas Carols / Suite Op. 14 / Three Hungarian Folk-Tunes (Hungaroton, 1967)
Schumann : Piano Concerto in A minor Op. 54 (Hungaroton 1970)
Chopin : Etudes, Op. 10 / Nocturne In B Major, Op.9/3 / Ballade In F Major, Op. 38 / Ballade In G Minor, Op. 23 (Hungaroton 1971)
Beethoven : Sonata No.8 C-Moll, Op. 13 'Pathétique', Sonata No.24 In F Sharp Major, Op. 78, Sonata No.21 In C Major, Op. 53 'Waldstein' (Hungaroton 1971)
Mozart : Sonata for Two Pianos in D Major, K448 / Ravel Ma Mère l'Oye / Brahms Variations on a Theme of Haydn, Op. 56b with Zoltan Kocsis (Hungaroton1973)
Mozart : Concerti for Two and Three Pianos, with Zoltán Kocsis, András Schiff, Hungarian State Orchestra, János Ferencsik (Hungaroton 1973)
Schumann : Carnaval / Waldszenen (Hungaroton 1973)
Schubert : Wanderer Fantasie, Klavierstück in E♭, Piano Sonata in G (Hungaroton 1974)
Schubert : Sonata in B-Flat Major, Impromptus (Denon 1975)
Bartók : Sonata for Two Pianos and Percussion, with Zoltán Kocsis, Ferenc Petz, József Marton (Hungaroton 1976)
Mozart : Complete Keyboard Solo Music (Hungaroton 1976)
Bartók : Mikrokozmosz, For Children (1908–1909) (Hungaroton 1977)
Debussy : Images I-II / Children's Corner / L'Isle Joyeuse (Hungaroton 1977)
Liszt : Dante Sonata (Hungaroton 1978)
Mozart : Sonatas for Piano Duet (complete) with Zoltán Kocsis, (Hungaroton 1978)
Mozart : Piano Concertos: No. 9 & No. 14 (Hungaroton 1978)
Stravinsky : Három Tétel A Petruskából / Piano-Rag-Music / Tango / Szerenád A-ban / Szonáta (Hungaroton 1979)
Schumann : Kinderszenen Op.15 / Fantasy Op.17 / Arabeske Op.18 (Hungaroton 1979)
Beethoven : Sonatas and Variations for Cello and Piano (Complete) with Miklós Perényi (Hungaroton 1979)
Mozart : Piano Quartets KV 478 & 493, with the Éder Quartet (Telefunken 1979)
Brahms : Piano Quintet in F Minor. Op. 34, with the Bartók Quartet (Hungaroton 1980)
Weiner, Strawinsky, Bartók, Schumann, Verdi, Debussy (works for clarinet) with Kálmán Berkes
Chopin : Preludes (Hungaroton 1982)
Lieder by Schubert, Schumann, Brahms, Liszt, Wolf (Hungaroton 1982)
Brahms : Horn Trio / Beethoven Horn Sonata / R. Strauss Andante with Ferenc Tarjáni, Gábor Takács-Nagy (Hungaroton 1983)
Ravel : Sonatine, Valses Nobles et Sentimentales, Gaspard de la nuit, Menuet sur le nom d'Haydn, Prelude (Hungaroton 1984)
Brahms : Intermezzi op.116–119, Ballades op.10,  (Harmonia Mundi France 1994)
Bartók : Piano Concerto No. 3, Three Burlesques, Allegro Barbaro, Suite Op. 14 (Hungaroton 1994)
Satie : Socrate, Liszt Via Crucis with Edit Klukon, (Budapest Music Center Records 2005)	.

Awards
1972 Grand Prix du Disque for Chopin recital (1971)
1973 Liszt Prize
1978 Kossuth Prize
1982 Art Prize of City of Budapest
1984 Merited Artist
1988 Bartók-Pásztory Award
1990 Excellent Artist
2005 Prima Primissima Award
2006 Bartók Memorial Award (Herend)
2007 For Hungarian Art
2008 Kossuth Prize

References

External links

Biography at Naxos.com
Biography at ClassicsOnline.com

1951 births
Hungarian classical pianists
Hungarian male musicians
Male classical pianists
Musicians from Budapest
Academic staff of the Franz Liszt Academy of Music
Living people